The British Rail Class 46 is a class of diesel locomotive. They were built from 1961 to 1963 at British Railways' Derby Works and were initially numbered D138–D193. With the arrival of TOPS they were renumbered to Class 46. Along with the similar Class 44 and 45 locomotives, they became known as Peaks.

Fifty-six locomotives were built. The first was withdrawn in 1977 and all were withdrawn by the end of 1984.

Overview
The Class 46 design was structurally the same as the preceding Class 45 build, and had the same Sulzer engine, but differed in the fitment of a Brush generator and traction motors, in place of the Crompton Parkinson equipment fitted to the Class 45. Along with the other Sulzer class 44 and 45 designs they are often referred to as "Peaks", so named because the earliest of the Class 44 were named after mountains.

The British Transport Commission decided to cancel the final twenty Class 46 locomotives then on order and invited bids for twenty locomotives of a new Type 4 specification using the Brush electrical equipment intended for the cancelled order. Brush won the contract with what became the Class 47.

Naming 

Unlike the earlier Peak designs, many of which were named, only one class 46 was so graced: D163 (later 46 026) carried the name Leicestershire and Derbyshire Yeomanry from new. This engine was nicknamed "The Lady" by both staff and rail fans alike. This name is now carried by the preserved Class 45 number D123 / 45 125.

Operation

Whilst seeing intermittent use on freight trains, Class 46s were regular performers on passenger turns, particularly North East-South West, Trans-Pennine and secondary North East-London trains, and depot allocations reflected this with locos at Gateshead and Plymouth in 1977 giving a typical spread. Long-distance freight workings were common, particularly "clay hoods" carrying china clay from Cornwall to the Stoke-on-Trent area.

In the 1980s the remaining locomotives were concentrated at Gateshead depot, and the final booked passenger workings for the class were the dated summer Saturday services Bradford - Weymouth (between Bradford and Birmingham New Street), Newcastle - Plymouth, Newcastle - Blackpool North, and York - Blackpool North.

Nuclear flask crash test

On 17 July 1984, 46 009 (formerly D146), hauling three Mark 1 coaches, was deliberately crashed into a "Flatrol" wagon loaded with a nuclear waste flask and lying on its side. The test was intended to demonstrate to the public that there would be no leak of radioactive material in the event of a rail accident involving a train carrying a nuclear waste flask.

46 009 was scrapped on site at Old Dalby later the same month by Vic Berry of Leicester. The flask is on display outside Heysham 1 power station training centre.  Images

Preservation
Three have been preserved: 46 010 (formerly D147) at the Nottingham Heritage Railway, 46 035 Ixion (formerly D172) at Peak Rail owned by the Waterman Railway Trust and D182 (46 045) at the Midland Railway - Butterley, in Derbyshire. 

In February 1994, D172 became the first privately-owned ex-BR diesel to be certified for main line operation.

Gallery

References

Sources

Further reading

External links

 Railblue.com A list of fleet numbers with dates  withdrawn.

1Co-Co1 locomotives
46
Railway locomotives introduced in 1961
Standard gauge locomotives of Great Britain
Diesel-electric locomotives of Great Britain